Adrián Navarro (born 24 October 1969 in Laferrere, Buenos Aires province) is an Argentine film  and television actor.

Filmography
 Ay Juancito (2004)
 Hermanas (2005)
 Ciudad en celo (2006) a.k.a. City in Heat 
 El Amor y la ciudad (2006) 
 Que parezca un accidente (2007)
 Las Viudas de los Jueves (2009) aka The Widows of Thursdays
 Medianeras (2011)
 Resurrection (2016 Argentine film)

Television
 "Alta comedia" (1991)
 "Mi cuñado" (1993)
 "Buenos vecinos" (1999) a.k.a. "Neighbours" 
 "Luna salvaje" (2000) a.k.a. "Wild Moon" 
 "Por ese palpitar" (2000)
 "Yago, pasión morena" (2001) a.k.a. "Yago, Pure Passion" 
 "22, el loco" (2001) a.k.a. "Love Triangle" 
 "Máximo corazón" (2002) a.k.a. "Máximo in My Heart" 
 "Franco Buenaventura, el profe" (2002) a.k.a. "Tango Lover" 
 "Son amores" (2002) a.k.a. "Sweethearts" 
 "Malandras" (2003) a.k.a. "Malandras" 
 "Culpable de este amor" (2004) a.k.a. "Laura's Secret" 
 "Ringtone" (2005)
 "Doble vida" (2005)
 "Montecristo" (2007)
 "Vidas Robadas" (2008)
 "Lobo, una leyenda de pasion" (2012) a.k.a. "Wolf, a legend of passion"
 "La defensora" (2012) 
 "Historia clinica" (2012)

References

External links
 

1969 births
Argentine male film actors
Living people
People from Buenos Aires Province